Cosmo Newbery (also spelt Cosmo Newberry) is a small Aboriginal community in Western Australia,  east of Perth between Laverton and Warburton in the Goldfields-Esperance region of Western Australia.

History
The town is named after James Cosmo Newbery, an industrial chemist noted for his work on improving the chlorination method of gold extraction.

The area was originally leased by two returned soldiers as a cattle station, then as a penal colony for a short time, then later became a government ration depot. The town was first settled in 1920.  By 1953 the Uniting Church set up a mission but eventually, in 1976, gave the land back to the Aboriginal people living in the area at that time. The town operated for 11 years and was then abandoned for 4 years. In 1989 four families moved back into the town, quickly followed by others. The town now has a health clinic, school, a hall, windmills, communication centre, fuel station and shop.

The town is one of the stops along the Great Central Road that tracks through the Great Victoria Desert and eventually connects with the Gunbarrel Highway; there is a roadhouse operating in the town.

Native title
The community is located within the Yilka and Yilka #2 and Sullivan Family (WCD2017/005) native title determination.

Governance
The community is managed through its incorporated body, Cosmo Newberry Aboriginal Corporation, incorporated under the Aboriginal Councils and Associations Act 1976 on 31 January 1991.

Town planning
Cosmo Newberry Layout Plan No.1 has been prepared in accordance with State Planning Policy 3.2 Aboriginal Settlements. Layout Plan No. 1 was endorsed by the community on 19 May 2000 and by the Western Australian Planning Commission  on 21 August 2001.

The Layout Plan map-set and background report can be viewed at Planning Western Australia's web site.

References

External links
 Planning Western Australia's official site – Cosmo Newberry Layout Plan (https://www.dplh.wa.gov.au/information-and-services/state-planning/aboriginal-communities/aboriginal-community-maps/layout-plans)

Shire of Laverton
Aboriginal communities in Goldfields-Esperance